Peter Weir is an Australian film director.

He was a leading figure in the Australian New Wave cinema movement (1970–1990), with films such as the mystery drama Picnic at Hanging Rock (1975), the supernatural thriller The Last Wave (1977) and the historical drama Gallipoli (1981). The climax of Weir's early career was the $6 million multi-national production The Year of Living Dangerously (1983).

After the success of The Year of Living Dangerously, Weir directed a diverse group of American and international films covering most genres—many of them major box office hits—including Academy Award-nominated films such as the thriller Witness (1985), the drama Dead Poets Society (1989), the romantic comedy Green Card (1990), the social science fiction comedy-drama The Truman Show (1998) and the epic historical drama Master and Commander: The Far Side of the World (2003). For his work on these five films, Weir personally accrued six Academy Award nominations as either a director, writer or producer.

Since 2003, Weir's productivity has declined, having directed only one subsequent feature, the critically acclaimed box-office flop The Way Back (2010).

Feature films

Short films

Documentary

Television

References

Director filmographies
Australian filmographies